The 1940 Cornell Big Red football team was an American football team that represented Cornell University during the 1940 college football season.  In their fifth season under head coach Carl Snavely, the Big Red compiled a 6–2 record and outscored their opponents by a combined total of 201 to 38.

Schedule

References

Cornell
Cornell Big Red football seasons
Cornell Big Red football